is an Italian hip hop musical group formed in Milan in 2019. The group is composed by vocalists Tommaso "Berna" Bernasconi, Andrea "Mala" Malatesta, Francesco "Glampo" Lamperti, Andrea "Armo" Arminio and Tommaso "Petta" Manzoni.

History 
The music project was born in Milan, more precisely in the Piazza Leonardo da Vinci area. After performing at several festivals in the city, they released their first singles including "Bibite", "Americana", "Fuori il petto" and "Straintra".

In 2021 they obtained a recording contract with the label Woodworm, with whom they released their debut EP Zafferano, from which the single "Gremolada" was extracted. In the summer of the same year they performed at Mi Manchi, a substitute festival for the annual MI AMI Festival.

In April 2022, they released the single "Chiara", in collaboration with the Brazilian music group Selton, which brought the group national fame. In the summer of 2022, the group performed as the opening band for concerts of various artists including Blanco, Dutch Nazari and the Psicologi. At the same time, they continued to perform at major Italian music festivals such as Goa-Boa in Genoa and the Mengo Music Fest in Arezzo.

Colla Zio manage to qualify in the top six, with their entry "Asfalto", by rightfully accessing the festival in the  category. "Non mi va" was later announced as their entry for the Sanremo Music Festival 2023.

Band members 

 Tommaso "Berna" Bernasconi − vocals
 Andrea "Mala" Malatesta − vocals
 Francesco "Glampo" Lamperti − vocals
 Andrea "Armo" Arminio − vocals, guitar
 Tommaso "Petta" Manzoni − vocals, keyboards, synthesizer

Discography

Studio albums

Extended plays

Singles

References 

Italian pop music groups
Musical groups established in 2019
2019 establishments in Italy
Musical groups from Milan